Vache Sharafyan, (born February 11, 1966 in Yerevan, Armenia) is an Armenian composer of symphonic works, chamber music, choral music and opera. His works include 2 acts opera King Abgar, ballet Second Moon, 2 acts ballet Ancient Gods, one act ballet “the bride of the desert”.

His works have been commissioned or performed by Yo-Yo Ma and "Silk Road Ensemble", Yuri Bashmet and The Ensemble "Soloists of Moscow", The Hilliard Ensemble, Boston Modern Orchestra Project, Dresden Symphony Orchestra, Rostok Philharmonic, The Metropolitan Museum of Arts (2018), Soli Deo Gloria Psalm project, Jacaranda on the Edge fest, Estonian State Male Choir, Hover State Chamber Choir, and the Apricus Trio.

Critical reception
The New York Times called his work Adumbrations of the Peacock "a stark, mysterious and ultimately majestic concatenation of broken-bell piano chords, tremulous melodies and quivering textures.". 

The Boston Globe said of the commissioned work Sinfonia No. 2 un poco concertante, that it was "complex, deliberate, ultimately captivating".

The Chicago Tribune said of his work for the Silk Road Ensemble that "The seamless evolution of moods and textures—from soft, somber lines made up of pained intervals, to more violent outbursts, back to mournful lines—made it entirely absorbing to the ear and mind."

References

External links
Personal homepage
 

 

1966 births
Living people
Musicians from Yerevan
Komitas State Conservatory of Yerevan alumni
Armenian composers